The Clinton 12 were a group of twelve African-American students who integrated the previously all white Clinton High School in Clinton, Tennessee in 1956. These students were some of the first to participate in desegregation of southern K-12 public schools. African-American students had to remain in segregation until the 1954 ruling of Brown v. Board of Education. The Clinton 12 were subject to discrimination and violence for attending the all-white high school, which caused some of them to leave the school and move to other states. The integration of this school caused turmoil in both its black and white communities. Out of the original twelve, only two students of the group ended up graduating from Clinton High School. The twelve students were Jo Ann Allen, Bobby Cain, Anna Theresser Caswell, Gail Ann Epps, Minnie Ann Dickey, Ronald Gordon Hayden, William Latham, Alvah Jay McSwain, Maurice Soles, Robert Thacker, Regina Turner, and Alfred Williams.

Background 
In 1954, the Supreme Court of the United States ruled that Tennessee schools had to desegregate in the case Brown v. Board of Education. Prior to that decision, schools for white students received much more money than their black counterparts. Black students in Anderson County were bused to Knoxville (a 35 minute drive, one way) to attend their segregated schools. Black families and the black community sought equal education for their children, and the matter was taken to the courts. In 1950, a few years prior to the Supreme court ruling, some African-American students tried to enroll in Clinton High School, but were denied. This issue was taken to court and became known as McSwain et al. v. County Board of Education of Anderson County, Tennessee. The judge ruled that the students could not enroll. Anderson County Public Schools tried to delay desegregation of schools as long as they could, but was ordered in January 1956 to start the process in the upcoming school year. In the fall of 1956, the Clinton 12 were enrolled into Clinton High School.

Integration 
The first day of classes for the Clinton 12 was mostly peaceful. However, the second day was filled with violence, protests, and riots. A group of white supremacists and people who favored segregation showed up to Clinton to stop the desegregation. The leader of this group was John Kasper who was an executive of the White Citizen Council and a member of the Ku Klux Klan. This group of adults, along with white students, screamed obscenities and threats at the Clinton 12 as they entered the school. Even after a judge ordered him to stop, Kasper led large protests outside the school until he was arrested for contempt of court. Unfortunately, even with Kasper in jail, violence was still at an all-time high. A new segregationist leader, Asa Carter, came in to continue the riots.

During the first two days of the school year in September, white supremacists and pro-segregationists damaged or destroyed property including windows and vehicles. They also sent bomb threats to several local places and people in the community, including the county courthouse, newspaper, and even the mayor's house. The Tennessee National Guard was sent down to Clinton to restore peace.

Discrimination and threats continued after the National Guard arrived. Crosses were burned in the yards of community members who supported integration, and the Black communities of the Clinton 12 were terrorized, with guns fired at their homes and dynamite thrown at their homes and businesses. The violence became so bad that many of the Clinton 12 withdrew from the school. The Clinton principal's family, as well as some of the Clinton 12 families, fled the town for their safety.

The few of the Clinton 12 that remained had to be escorted to school. Paul Turner, a white pastor, who escorted the group on December 4, 1956, was attacked and badly beaten by a white mob. This caused the school to close completely for about a week. Clinton saw most of its violence during the first few months after the initial integration with the Clinton 12.

Just two years after the Clinton 12 first integrated the high school, and with plenty of time for racial tensions to escalate, Clinton High School was bombed and was destroyed on October 5, 1958.

Legacy 
Due to all the violence and opposition, only two of the Clinton 12 ended up graduating from Clinton High School. Bobby Cain, in 1957, was the first Black man to graduate from Clinton High School, and Gail Ann Epps, in 1958, was the first Black woman. After fundraising by the local community and Reverend Billy Graham, enough funds were collected to rebuild Clinton High School and it opened back up in 1960. After the opening of the new school, there were no major reports or incidents of violence and discrimination. The Clinton 12 made huge sacrifices to obtain opportunities for equal education, for themselves and for the generations that came after them. They set precedents in the American education system, especially in the South and Appalachian regions of the United States of America.

References 

Wikipedia Student Program
School desegregation pioneers
Education in Anderson County, Tennessee